Barbarka  is a village in the administrative district of Gmina Skała, within Kraków County, Lesser Poland Voivodeship, in southern Poland.

The village has a population of 210.

References

Barbarka